A life study is a work of art showing a human figure, often made in a life class.  it may also refer to:

 Life Study (film), a 1973 romance film